Santiago de Cuba Province is the second most populated province in the island of Cuba. The largest city Santiago de Cuba is the main administrative center. Other large cities include Palma Soriano, Contramaestre, San Luis and Songo-la Maya.

History
Santiago de Cuba province has been the site of many battles, both during the war for independence and the 1959 Cuban Revolution, where much of the guerrilla fighting took place in the mountainous province.

Prior to 1976, Cuba was divided into six historical provinces. One of these was Oriente province, which was, prior to 1905, known as Santiago de Cuba province. The present day province comprises the south-central region of Oriente.

Economy
The province is rich in material resources such as iron and nickel. The economy, however, relies mostly on agriculture, with large plantations growing bananas, cacao, and coffee dotting the landscape. Industry is growing around the capital, as is tourism. The natural environment of the province attracts tourists from elsewhere in Cuba and from overseas.

Municipalities

Source: Population from 2004 Census. Area from 1976 municipal re-distribution.

Demographics
In 2004, the province of Santiago De Cuba had a population of 1,043,202.

International relations

Twin towns — Sister cities
Santiago de Cuba Province is twinned with:
 Naples, Italy

See also

Oriente Province

References

External links

Santiago.cu (in Spanish)
Travel info on Santiago de Cuba
santiagoencuba.com (in Spanish)
Santiago de Cuba City (in English and Spanish)

 
Provinces of Cuba
States and territories established in 1976